Ossip Zadkine (28 January 1888 – 25 November 1967) was a Belarusian-born French artist. He is best known as a sculptor, but also produced paintings and lithographs.

Early years and education
Zadkine was born on 28 January 1888 as Yossel Aronovich Tsadkin in the city of Vitsebsk, Russian Empire (now Belarus). He was born to a baptized Jewish father and a mother named Zippa-Dvoyra, who he claimed to be of Scottish origin.  Archival materials state that Iosel-Shmuila Aronovich Tsadkin was of Jewish faith and studied in the Vitebsk City Technical School between 1900 and 1904, including two years in one class with would-be artists Marc Chagall (then Movsha Shagal) and Victor Mekler (then Avigdor Mekler). Archival materials contradict Zadkine himself and states that his father did not convert to the Russian Orthodox religion and his mother was not of a Scottish extraction. He had 5 siblings: sisters Mira, Roza and Fania and brothers Mark and Moses.

At the age of fifteen, Zadkine was sent by his father to Sunderland to learn English and "good manners". He then moved to London and attended lessons at the Regent Street Polytechnic where he considered the teachers to be too conservative.

Zadkine settled in Paris in 1910. He studied at the École des Beaux-Arts for six months. In 1911 he lived and worked in La Ruche. While in Paris he joined the Cubist movement, working in a Cubist idiom from 1914 to 1925. He later developed his own style, one that was strongly influenced by African and Greek art.

Career 
In 1921 he obtained French citizenship. Zadkine served as a stretcher-bearer in the French Army during World War I, and was wounded in action. He spent World War II in the US. His best-known work is probably the sculpture The Destroyed City (1951-1953), representing a man without a heart, a memorial to the destruction of the center of the Dutch city of Rotterdam in 1940 by the Nazi-German Luftwaffe.

He taught sculpture classes at Académie de la Grande Chaumière until 1958, students of his included artists Geula Dagan (1925–2008) and Genevieve Pezet.

Death and legacy 
Zadkine died in Paris in 1967 at the age of 79 after undergoing abdominal surgery and was interred in the Cimetière du Montparnasse.

Museums 
His former home and studio in Montparnasse is now the Musée Zadkine. When his former wife Prax died, she donated the house and art studio to the City of Paris for the formation of Musée Zadkine.

There is also a Musée Zadkine in the village of Les Arques in the Midi-Pyrénées region of France. Zadkine lived in Les Arques for a number of years, and while there, carved an enormous Christ on the Cross and Pieta that are featured in the 12th-century church which stands opposite the museum.

Personal life
In August 1920, Zadkine married Valentine Prax (1897–1981), an Algerian-born painter of Sicilian and French-Catalan descent. Prax and Zadkine had no children.

Zadkine was a neighbor in Montparnasse and a friend of Henry Miller and was represented by the character "Borowski" in Miller's novel, Tropic of Cancer (1934). His other neighbors there included Chaïm Soutine, and Tsuguharu Foujita.

While living in Manhattan during wartime from 1942 to 1945, Zadkine had a relationship with American artist Carol Janeway and created several portraits of her.

The artist's only child, Nicolas Hasle (born 1960), was born after an affair with a Danish woman, Annelise Hasle. Since 2009, Hasle, a psychiatrist, who had been acknowledged by the artist and had his parentage legally established in France in the 1980s, has been party to a lawsuit with the City of Paris to establish his claim to his father's estate.

Awards
1950 Venice Biennale sculpture prize
1961 Grand Prix National des Arts

Legacy
 A school in Rotterdam was named after Zadkine, as part of their training they even have Zadkine airlines.

Gallery

Public collections
Among the public collections holding works by Ossip Zadkine are:
 Van Abbemuseum, Eindhoven, Netherlands
 Museum de Fundatie, Zwolle, Netherlands
 Tel Aviv Museum of Art, Israel
 Musée Zadkine

See also
 Musée Zadkine
 Rue Zadkine

References

 Czwiklitzer, Christophe, Ossip Zadkine, le sculpteur-graveure de 1919 à 1967, Paris, Chez l'auteur, 1967.
 Yamanashi Kenritsu Bijutsukan, Ossip Zadkine, Tokyo, Yomiuri Shinbunsha, 1989.
 Andreas Weiland, "(Re-)Discovering Zadkine", in: Art in Society, issue # 10

External links

 Zadkine Research Center
 
 Zadkine Museum in Paris
 Zadkine Museum in Les Arques
 

1888 births
1967 deaths
Belarusian sculptors
20th-century Russian sculptors
20th-century Russian male artists
Russian male sculptors
Modern sculptors
Jewish sculptors
Russian Jews
French people of Belarusian-Jewish descent
Russian people of Scottish descent
Belarusian people of British descent
French people of Scottish descent
Alumni of Chelsea College of Arts
Burials at Montparnasse Cemetery
School of Paris
Emigrants from the Russian Empire to France
20th-century French sculptors
French male sculptors